The Eleionomae or Heleionomai (derived from heleios and nomos) were the naiads of the fresh-water marshes and wetlands in ancient Greek mythology.

Notes

References 
  Google Books.

Naiads